Minalin, officially the Municipality of Minalin, is a 4th class municipality in the province of Pampanga, Philippines. According to the 2020 census, it has a population of 48,380 people.

The town is known for its 400-year-old church, the Santa Monica Parish Church, with its unique design that incorporates pre-colonial architectural motif alongside its European Catholic iconography.   Minalin is also known for its "Aguman Sanduk" New Year's Celebration, where in which the town's straight men dress up as beauty queens and ride through town on festive floats. The town is also referred to as the "Egg Basket of Central Luzon" because of its large-scale production of eggs and chickens, prompting the town to put up the Philippines' first egg festival in 2008.

Etymology
Pansomun (grandson of Prince Balagtas, the ruler of the Kapampangan empire and Luzon), in his will, claimed to be a cousin of Rajah Soliman and Lakandula, the chieftains of Manila and Tondo in 1571 (conquest by Spain). Pansomun, as Christian convert Fernando Malang Balagtas signed in 1589 a will on the Kapampangan territory. Pansomun/Balagtas stated that he was born in Tabungao (Santa Maria, the old location of Minalin).

The legend of Minalin's name came from "minalis la ding dutung, minalis ya ing pisamban" (the lumber moved, and so must the church). Lumber stocks at Santa Maria for the church construction were carried by floods to a hilly Burol. Capitan Diego Tolentino wrote "minalis", thus, the name Minalin evolved.

A Malayan settlement of Kahn Bulaun, Prince Balagtas' descendant, also found in the place, beautiful women. The Spaniards called the sitio, "mina linda de las mujerers"  (a mine of beautiful women), which could also be the source of the town's name. Subsequently, Chinese traders abbreviated the words to "Minalin".

Minalin's name might have originated also from "minalis" ("to move to"). "Mina" means mine, a word written on a rock left at the sitio in 1700 by a Spaniard José Espeleta, and  "Lin", the founder's name.

Gobernadorcillo (Mayor) Diego Tolentino wrote Minalin in lieu of Minalis and the Calendario Manual y Guia de Forasteros, 1839 to 1841, spelled Minalin, thus Minalin.

In 1860 Minalin was a producer of rice, corn, sugar cane, cacao, indigo (añil) and fruits, including dye, nipa wine, vinegar and mats (petates).

Geography

Barangays
Minalin is politically subdivided into 15 barangays.

 Bulac
 Dawe
 Lourdes
 Maniango
 San Francisco Javier
 San Francisco de Asisi
 San Isidro
 San Nicolas (Poblacion)
 San Pedro
 Santa Catalina
 Santa Maria
 Santa Rita
 Santo Domingo
 Santo Rosario
 Saplad

Climate

Demographics

Economy 

Minalin is one of the fastest growing economy in Pampanga despite its propensity to develop flooding.

Merchandising, farming and fishing are the usual source of living of Minalenos.  The town is known as the "Egg Basket of Central Luzon" because of its large scale production of eggs and chickens. Tilapia, shrimp, crabs are also major products of the town.

Government

The municipal government is divided into three branches: executive, legislative and judiciary. The judicial branch is administered solely by the Supreme Court of the Philippines. The legislative branch is composed of the Sangguniang Bayan (town assembly), Sangguniang Barangay (barangay council), and the Sangguniang Kabataan for the youth sector.

The mayor and vice mayor are elected to three-year terms. The mayor is the executive head and leads the town's departments in executing the ordinances and improving public services. The vice mayor heads a legislative council (Sangguniang Bayan) consisting of councilors from the barangays or barrios.

Elected officials
Municipal Officials (2022-2025):
Mayor: NOEL PHILIP SIOJO NAGUIT
Vice Mayor: RONDON MUSNGI MERCADO
Councilors:
 NAGUIT, SAE
 SUNGA, DANILO
 LAGMAN, RAMBO
 DAAG, QUEROLICO
 FLORES, FRANCISCO JR.
 SITCHON, EDGAR
 SUBA, RICO
 SOTTO, JOHN NIKKI

Landmarks and attractions
Tourist attractions of the town include its "Aguman Sandoc" New Year's Celebration and the 400-year old Santa Monica Parish Church in Barangay San Nicolas.

"Aguman Sanduk" Festival (Minalin New Year's Celebration)

One major tourist attraction in Minalin is its "Aguman Sanduk" New Year's Celebration in which the straight men of the town dress as beauty queens and ride through town on festive floats - displaying not only humor but also the camaraderie and charity of each member of the community.

The celebration has also been referred to as the "Belles of Minalin" but Minalin natives prefer to continue calling the event "Aguman Sanduk", which translates literally as "Association of the Ladle".The event is differentiated from gay pride parades because the event is specifically intended for heterosexual males, and is intended simply to be an act of fun, rather than a statement about gender.

This is an avenue where men from all walks of life cross-dress and dare to step out of their statuses. Whether you are a known public figure, a farmer, or a professional, it is with utmost pride that a man from Minalin will dare step out of his status to give joy (pikatulan) to his people. With the continuous celebration of the festival, it is a living proof of how Minaleños value camaraderie (pamakiabe). It is the dare that keeps the community's bond and strengthen the ties of Minaleños.

This annual display of beautiful dresses and expertise in women's make up signifies that this town follows the dynamic changes in women's fashion not only in the Philippines but also in Europe, Asia and in other countries.

Egg Festival 
On June 4, 2008, Minalin celebrated its fame for producing over a million chicken eggs per day by holding the country's first "First Egg Festival." An exhibit of Minalin's egg produce was put up, and a taste test of 10,000 boiled eggs was held. Also, 70 poultry raisers donated 100,000 eggs to Typhoon Cosme's victims in the nearby provinces of Pangasinan and Zambales.

Mayor Edgar Flores and President Gloria Macapagal Arroyo graced the exhibit of their egg produce, and a taste test of 10,000 boiled eggs. Also, 70 poultry raisers donated 80,000 eggs to Pangasinan's "Cosme" typhoon victims, and 20,000 shall go to Zambales.

La Purisima Concepcion Festival 
On 2008, the Sta Maria Barangay Youth Ministry of Barangay Sta Maria spearheaded the said festival. It is in honor of the Image of La Purisima Concepcion which was according to the book, in the year 1609, an image was found placed inside a dried gourd skin (Tabungao in Spanish) floating in front of the chapel they were building.

the chairmen of this Festival are:
2019- Noelene Pingol and Jaycee Lagman
2018- Jovaine Ordonez and Kriz Miranda
2017- Roana Kelly Sese and Jaycee Lagman
2016- Roana Kelly Sese and Renalyn Guuiriba
2015- Claud Domme Yambao and Rhysdale Sabado
2014-2013- Mary Donna Mae Mangsal
2012- Romel Zapata
2011- Jerry Canlas
2010- +Liway Manalansan
2009- Aizelle Tubig
2008- Nevil Pineda

Notable personalities
 Governor Eddie T. Panlilio, the former governor of Pampanga.

Images

References

External links

 Minalin Profile at PhilAtlas.com
 [ Philippine Standard Geographic Code]
Philippine Census Information
Local Governance Performance Management System

Municipalities of Pampanga